The United Arab Emirates competed at the 2008 Summer Paralympics in Beijing, China. The Emirati delegation consisted of 24 people, of whom eight were competitors: six athletes, one powerlifter and one sport shooter. Other members of the delegation included representatives of the country's Athletes with Special Needs organization, led by Abdul Razak Ahmed al Rasheed. The Emirati team was sponsored by the Abu Dhabi-based Union National Bank.

Medallists
The country won one medal, a silver.

Sports

Athletics

Men's track

Men's field

Women's field

Powerlifting

Shooting

See also
 United Arab Emirates at the Paralympics
 United Arab Emirates at the 2008 Summer Olympics

References

Nations at the 2008 Summer Paralympics
2008
Paralympics